Per Werner Pedersen (born 30 March 1969) is a Danish former footballer who played the majority of his career for Danish clubs Odense BK and Lyngby BK. Pedersen scored two goals in six games for the Danish national team between 1991 and 1997. In 1997, he became the most expensive player sold by a Danish football club, when he signed a £2.5 million transfer deal with English club Blackburn Rovers, where he scored once against Chelsea at Stamford Bridge. Pedersen also had short stints with German club Borussia Mönchengladbach and Racing Strasbourg in France. He moved back to Denmark to play for Odense BK, where he suffered a career-ending injury, and retired in June 2001.

Pedersen also appeared in matches for Denmark's league selection, in which he played in several matches not considered fully official. A high point of his career came in 1997, when he scored four goals in a game for Denmark against the United States at the U.S. Cup.

Honours
 Danish football championship: 1989, 1991–92
 Danish Cup: 1990–91, 1992–93

References

External links
 Danish national team profile 
 
 
 

1969 births
Living people
Danish men's footballers
RC Strasbourg Alsace players
Borussia Mönchengladbach players
Blackburn Rovers F.C. players
Premier League players
Odense Boldklub players
Lyngby Boldklub players
Ligue 1 players
Bundesliga players
Danish Superliga players
Danish expatriate men's footballers
Expatriate footballers in England
Expatriate footballers in Germany
Expatriate footballers in France
Denmark international footballers
Denmark under-21 international footballers
Sportspeople from Aalborg
Association football forwards